Dan Roman is an entrepreneur, investor and IT professional with focus on emerging markets. In 1990, after the termination of the communist era in Romania, he was a pioneer in establishing one of the first private companies in the country, RBS Ltd. (Romanian Business Systems), that became the local market leader. Roman managed RBS as CEO and owner until 1995, when he sold the company to IBM.

In 1996, he was appointed Director of IBM CER in Vienna, being responsible for countries in the Balkans and CIS area. In this capacity, he created for IBM a partner network and a framework for establishing local subsidiaries.

In 2000, Roman set up his own company, eNet Data G.m.b.H, based in Austria, dealing with IT services and solutions and with branches in a couple of countries from EE. eNet Data was acquired in 2002 by S&T, an Austrian IT public company. After the acquisition, Roman was appointed Senior VP of S&T and Region South / East General Manager, until end of 2008. From 2009 to 2011, Roman worked as President of the Management Board of S&T Romania and also as Senior Advisor of the S&T Group Board.

Starting with June 2011, Roman held the position of General Manager of Kapsch Romania until end of 2013. Starting with 2014, he is involved in the project of establishing a regional presence of Kapsch in South Eastern Europe.

Prior to founding RBS, Roman worked as Technical Director of ITC, the Research Institute for Computers in Romania, being responsible for software development. He was one of the first IT professionals who introduced in Romania the Computer Aided Design/ Computer Graphics as a field of research and development.

Dan Roman holds a PhD degree in Computer Science and graduated from the Politehnica University of Bucharest in Bucharest.

In parallel with his activity in the IT sector, Dan Roman is a passionate wine maker and founded in 2008 a company which deals with cultivating vines and grape processing.

References

Living people
Romanian businesspeople
Politehnica University of Bucharest alumni
Year of birth missing (living people)